Angela Chen (Xiao Yan Chen) is a Chinese businesswoman and the chairperson of the United States arm of the nonprofit cultural-exchange group China Arts Foundation.

References 

Living people
Chinese businesspeople
Year of birth missing (living people)